The Murjan Tower was a , 200 storey proposed skyscraper for construction in Manama, Bahrain. If finished, it would have been the tallest building in the world and would have been served as a hotel, commercial and residential building. Murjan Tower was the first in a series of skyscrapers planned in the area.

Once completed, if at all, the tower will be owned and operated by ProSec Architects, Sweden, while the architectural works will be headed by Henning Larsen, a Danish architect.

References

Skyscrapers in Bahrain
Proposed skyscrapers
Buildings and structures in Manama
Proposed buildings and structures in Bahrain
Towers in Bahrain